A Month of Sundays is a 2015 film starring Anthony LaPaglia.

Plot
Real estate agent Frank Mollard won't admit it, but he can't move on. Divorced but still attached, he can't sell a house in a property boom - much less connect with his teenage son. One night Frank gets a phone call from his mother. Nothing out of the ordinary. Apart from the fact that she died a year ago.

Thus blossoms a charming and unusual friendship with an elderly woman which inspires Frank to reconnect with life.

Cast
 Anthony LaPaglia as Frank Mollard
 Julia Blake as Sarah
 John Clarke as Phillip Lang
 Wayne Anthoney as Noel Lang
 Justine Clarke as Wendy
 Terence Crawford as Stuart

Reception
On Rotten Tomatoes, the film has an approval rating of 63% based on reviews from 19 critics.

Luke Buckmaster of The Guardian wrote "Situations, subplots and even barely seen characters are unified with an almost cosmic sense of fate." David Nusair of Reel Film Reviews wrote "One can only hope that this marks a temporary stumble for an otherwise talented filmmaker." Paul Byrnes in the Sydney Morning Herald said "A Month of Sundays is a small miracle of a film – an odd combination of modesty and ambition."

References

External websites
 
 A Month of Sundays at Internet Movie Database

2015 films
Australian drama films
Films directed by Matthew Saville
Films set in South Australia
2015 drama films
2010s English-language films
2010s Australian films